"Love Me Over Again" is a song written and recorded by American country music artist Don Williams.  It was released in December 1979 as the first single from the album Portrait.  The song was Williams' tenth number one on the country chart, and the only number one of his career in which he was the sole writer.  The single went to number one for one week and spent twelve weeks on the country chart.

Chart performance

Year-end charts

References

1979 singles
1979 songs
Don Williams songs
Song recordings produced by Garth Fundis
Songs written by Don Williams
MCA Records singles